Michael Allen Morgan (born June 12, 1948) is an American singer-songwriter and record producer. When talking about him, Kathie Baillie, of Baillie & the Boys, said "Some artists just have a knack for going to the right places, playing the melody in a way that sounds familiar, and yet at the same time fresh. Mike is that guy."

Early life and education 
Morgan was born in Jackson, Ohio on June 12, 1948 to Naomi Elizabeth (née Long) and John Willard Morgan as the youngest of three boys. As a teenager, Morgan, along with high school friend Paul Hanks, formed a garage band called The Truants in 1964. The group began to perform with members Craig Loney, Larry Coburn, John Jones, and Joe Click coming alongside Morgan and Hanks. The Truants became one of the major touring bands in the Tri-State.  They appeared in concert and on television with John Hamer's  Let's Dance TV program generated from Huntington, West Virginia. This appearance generated tremendous response for the band. In 2006, The Truants came back together to produce a CD, which led to the band performing several benefits across the region.

Morgan went on to study Education at Eastern Kentucky University, where he graduated in 1970. Afterwards, Morgan attended University of Dayton where he earned his master's degree in counseling, graduating in 1986.

Career
Morgan was surrounded by music his entire life. Growing up, he remembers his father, uncle, and aunt coming together on Sunday evenings to sing hymns. His brothers were also influential along his musical path. His oldest brother, Bob, was a drummer in a local group called The Four Jacks. Morgan grew up with all genres of music surrounding him.

In the late 1960s, David Howell approached Paul Hanks about recording two singles. Hanks remembered his time with The Truants and requested that Morgan come along as a producer for the singles. The two singles received regional airplay and sales. In 1968, Morgan met up with high school friend Jeff Elliott. The two began writing songs together and decided toward the end of 1968 to take the songs to Nashville, Tennessee. The duo was signed by Jack Key of Newkeys Music. With the help of Jack and Jimmy Key, Morgan and Elliott had their first songs recorded. During that time, Morgan met country artist Ed Bruce. Bruce had just formed a new publishing company and asked Morgan and Elliott to play some of their songs. Morgan and Elliott joined the company in 1971. In 1973, David Howell asked Morgan to record and release a single called "Walker's Woods", which received regional airplay in the Southern United States. This was the first single that featured Morgan as a recording artist. It was produced by Bruce.

In the late 1970s, Morgan moved on to Greene Pastures Music, which was owned by Nat Stuckey and his wife Ann. Conway Twitty recorded "The Feel of Bein' Gone" on his MCA Records album, Heart and Soul. Also, the song "Washed in the Blood" was recorded by Jimmie Davis.

Later in the 1980s, Morgan became discouraged and pushed music away. He spent an entire year not writing songs and avoiding music altogether. He was not sure how he was going to get back into the music game. While sitting in Dr. Greg Miller's office at University of Rio Grande, the path back to music came to Morgan. He was asked to present a program on Appalachian music to kindergarten and first grade students in Gallipolis City School District by the Ohio Arts Council. After talking with the teachers in the district, Morgan decided to teach the students some of the key components of music. It was at this time that Morgan, with help from his wife, realized that he may not be destined to win a Grammy Award or have a number 1 single, but just to enjoy making music and sharing it with others.

In the late 1990s, Morgan and Elliott teamed up again with  Miller to write the music for Miller's Off-Broadway play called Billy Bob Loves Charlene.

Morgan and Elliott again teamed up with Ed Bruce, as well as Jack Jackson, to co-produce a new album for Bruce called This Old Hat (2002). This was Bruce's first project in 10 years and features several traditional country songs. Morgan co-wrote several of the songs on the album as well. When talking about the album, Country Weekly magazine said "It's been way too long since we heard from Ed Bruce. His decade-long string of smashes like "You're The Best Break This Old Heart Ever Had" and "You Turn Me On (Like A Radio)" ended in the late 80's and he has been pretty much off the scene since then. So the big question has to be: Can he still cut it? This Old Hat answers that question in the warmest, most unassuming way you could imagine. Ed delivers these 13 songs - including some new versions of his old hits, such as a gorgeous take on "You're the Best Break" - in such a quietly confident way that you'd think he hasn't been away for a moment."

In 2015, Morgan was looking at some unfinished works and came across a song named "Sweet Liberty". He thought it could make a great patriotic choral piece and got into contact with Tom Fettke, a music arranger in Nashville. It was published by Praisegathering Music and released as a patriotic choral anthem. In that same year, Morgan teamed up with Austin, Texas Americana artist Slaid Cleaves. Cleaves, Morgan, and Elliott worked together to co-write two songs that appeared on Cleaves' Ghost on the Car Radio and Still Fightin' the War albums.

Following a similar theme to that of Ed Bruce, Morgan got in touch with Michael Bonagura of Baillie & the Boys to work on their first project in six years. Their work together began in 2015 on the CD I Will Run, which was released in February 2018.

Family life
He married his wife, Melody, in 1971. They have two children, Michael C. Morgan (born 1973) and Amanda J. Brumfield (born 1977).

1948 births
Living people
American male singers
People from Jackson, Ohio
Eastern Kentucky University alumni
University of Dayton alumni
Songwriters from Ohio
American male songwriters